Missouri's 7th congressional district consists of Southwest Missouri. The district includes Springfield, the home of Missouri State University, and the popular tourist destination city of Branson. Located along the borders of Kansas, Oklahoma, and Northwest Arkansas, the district occupies part of the Bible Belt with a strong socially conservative trend. George W. Bush defeated John Kerry here 67% to 32% in the 2004 election. Republican John McCain defeated Democrat Barack Obama 63.1% to 35.3% in the 2008 election. Republican and Former Massachusetts Governor Mitt Romney defeated Barack Obama 67.6% to 30.3% in the 2012 election. In the 2020 election, Republican Donald Trump defeated Democrat Joe Biden 69.91% to 28.93%. As of 2020, this district is the second most strongly Republican district in Missouri and is one of the most strongly Republican districts in the United States.

The district is currently represented by Republican Eric Burlison of Springfield.

Election results from presidential races

List of members representing the district

Counties

There are a total of 10 counties included in MO-07.

Largest cities 
The 10 largest cities in MO-07 are as follows.

Median household incomes

Median family incomes

Election results

Congressional

Presidential
2008

The table below shows how individual counties in MO-07 voted in the 2008 presidential election. U.S. Senator John McCain (R-Arizona) swept the district with 63.07 percent of the vote while U.S. Senator Barack Obama (D-Illinois) received 35.39 percent, a 27.68-percent margin of victory for the GOP. McCain received less than 60 percent in only Greene County, where Obama may have been helped by the college subplot presence of Missouri State University.

Primaries
2008

Republican
The table below shows how individual counties in MO-07 voted in the 2008 Missouri Republican Presidential Primary. Former Governor Mike Huckabee (R-Arkansas) carried every county in MO-07 over U.S. Senator John McCain (R-Arizona) and former Governor Mitt Romney (R-Massachusetts).

Democratic

The table below shows how individual counties in MO-07 voted in the 2008 Missouri Democratic Presidential Primary. Former U.S. Senator Hillary Rodham Clinton (D-New York) carried every county in the district by convincing margins over U.S. Senator Barack Obama (D-Illinois).

Gubernatorial
2008

The table below shows how individual counties in MO-07 voted in the 2008 Missouri gubernatorial election. Former Attorney General and now Governor Jay Nixon (D) lost the district to his challenger, former U.S. Representative Kenny Hulshof (R).

See also

Missouri's congressional districts
List of United States congressional districts

References

 Congressional Biographical Directory of the United States 1774–present
 https://www.census.gov/
 

07
Constituencies established in 1853
1853 establishments in Missouri
Constituencies disestablished in 1933
1933 disestablishments in Missouri
Constituencies established in 1935
1935 establishments in Missouri